Sepia kiensis is a species of cuttlefish native to the Indo-Pacific, specifically the Kai Islands, possibly to Timor and northern Australia. It lives at depth to 256 m. The validity of S. kiensis has been questioned.

Sepia kiensis grows to a mantle length of 37 mm.

The type specimen was collected off Kai Island in the Arafura Sea. It is deposited at The Natural History Museum in London.

References

External links

Cuttlefish
Molluscs described in 1885
Taxa named by William Evans Hoyle